Maciejewo  is a settlement in the administrative district of Gmina Poniec, within Gostyń County, Greater Poland Voivodeship, in west-central Poland.

The settlement has a population of 11.

References

Villages in Gostyń County